Grandia may refer to:

Grandia (series), video game franchise
Grandia (video game), first game
Grandia II, second game
Grandia III, third game
Grandia Xtreme, PS2 game
Grandia Online, online game
Grandia: Parallel Trippers, GBC game
Grandia: Digital Museum, other game